Wayne Coles-Janess is an Australian producer, writer and director of drama and documentary film and TV programs. Based in Melbourne, Australia, he has produced documentaries about frontier places in the country. He has also made some documentaries in several international locations, including during times of war.

Early life and education
Coles-Janess grew up near St. Kilda in Queensland, Australia, where he was the second of four children. His father was a chemical plant operator and his mother a ceramic artist. He started college as an engineering major but quit after a year. He spent time discovering Australia on a 250cc motorcycle. After this he went to the Queensland College of Art, where he graduated from the Film School. He has completed Three Post Graduates in Media, Art and Education.

Career
His short drama, On the Border of Hopetown (1992), received an AFI (Australian Film Institute) nomination. It has been screened at prominent international film festivals, including Clermont – Ferrand, Mannheim, and Chicago.  It has been shown to audiences at more than 150 international festivals, from Turkey to the San Francisco Golden Gate Awards.

His documentary Bougainville - Our Island Our Fight (1998) is about the civil war (1988-1998) in Papua New Guinea as the island of Bougainville sought independence. He explored the causes of the conflict, especially disagreement over operations and sharing of profits from the Panguna copper mine. His interview with Francis Ona, leader of the Bougainville Revolutionary Army, was released separately and widely broadcast in 1997. The film was screened at more than 35 international film festivals. It has won numerous international awards, including Best Documentary, Best Video Production, and Audience awards.

His documentary Life at the End of the Rainbow (2002) gives an account of people living on the land in the small rural community of Rainbow, at the edge of the Australian desert. Constructed in part from 1940s home movies, it portrays the town's growth and changes among its 500 residents as they struggle to eke out an existence for more than three generations, with global economics and government policy compounding the difficulties of marginal farming. It attained the second-highest rating in ABC’s prestigious True Stories documentary slot. Life at the End of the Rainbow has been shown on the international festival circuit, where it has won numerous awards.

His international award-winning feature, In the Shadow of the Palms (2005), is a documentary shot in part during the last weeks of Saddam Hussein's government in Iraq. It follows the Iraqis into "Operation Shock and Awe" and war. The last third of the film is based on Coles-Janess' return to Iraq in November 2003 for three months to document changes in life and society with the newly elected Iraqi government in place. This was the first Australian film to be entered in international competition in more than 12 years. There were no other entries. 
  
This is the third Australian film in the past 15 years to meet the standards for the highly competitive Yamagata International Documentary Film Festival. The festival is biannual and selects only 15 films from around the globe. In the Shadow of the Palms was voted the most popular film, winning the Audience Award.

Because of his work, Coles-Janess has been consulted as an expert in Iraq, and South Pacific culture and politics. His essays on related topics have been published in Time, The Age, The ABC, The Sydney Morning Herald, National Geographic Magazine, and numerous international media outlets.

He has been a guest and speaker at international film festivals in Turkey, USA, Brazil, Australia, Cambodia, Canada, Taiwan, Japan, Spain, Germany, and Iran. He has also served as a judge at international film festivals.

Coles-Janess has also worked as producer and director for the Nine Network’s 60 Minutes and ABC’s flagship program - Foreign Correspondent. He revamped SBS’s 13-part series front up, as well as its The Movie Show.

Based in Melbourne, Coles-Janess founded a media communications company, ipso-facto Productions, which creates documentaries and other communications.

List of films 
 In the Shadow of the Palms
 Bougainville – Our Island Our Fight
 Life at the End of the Rainbow
 On the Border of Hopetown
 Big City of Dreams

Coles-Janess, Wayne (1997). Bougainville "Sandline". © ipso-facto Productions, screened on ABC.
Coles-Janess, Wayne (1994). Bougainville "Broken Promises" © ipso-facto Productions, screened on ABC.
Coles-Janess, Wayne (1997). Bougainville "Inside Bougainville" © ipso-facto Productions, screened on ABC.

The film, Bougainville - Our Island Our Fight, was notable for covering the Bougainville Conflict.  It was picked up by SBS Television and went onto screen at approximately 50 International Film Festivals and Winning a number of Awards.

References

External links 
ipso-facto Productions

Australian documentary filmmakers
Year of birth missing (living people)
Living people
Queensland College of Art alumni
Film directors from Melbourne
Australian journalists
Australian war correspondents